Księga Tajemnicza. Prolog is the debut album of Polish hip-hop group Kaliber 44, released in 1996, on S.P. Records. The album is one of the most influential releases in the history of Polish hip-hop.

The album was entirely recorded and produced by members of Kaliber 44, except two tracks which were produced by Rahim from 3xKlan and Jajonasz. The sound of Księga Tajemnicza. Prolog is dark and minimalist, taking influences from psychedelic hip hop. The group called themselves "the Knights of Mary" ("Mary" being slang for marijuana).

The group was inspired by the sound and style of such groups as Gravediggaz and Wu-Tang Clan.

Track list 

1996 debut albums
Polish-language albums
Kaliber 44 albums